Stetson Bowl is a stadium in Surrey, British Columbia, Canada built in 1948. Located in the Cloverdale Fairgrounds, it was upgraded for minor league baseball and was the home field of the Surrey Glaciers of the Western Baseball League for the 1995 season. As a ballpark, the Stetson Bowl had a capacity of 5,000 people.

Today, it is the main venue of the Cloverdale Rodeo and Country Fair. "The Stetson Bowl Stadium is home to most of the Cloverdale Rodeo performances each year. The bleachers can hold 4000 spectators and portable seating can accommodate 800 additional spectators. Besides the rodeo, the stadium is commonly used for filming, festivals, concerts, sporting events and dog training classes."

The Surrey school board was petitioned by a local trustee in 2008 who argued that the Stetson Bowl should be used for more than a livestock and showdog display area.  The petition seeks to transform The Stetson Bowl to more of a human sports stadium, so it could "be revitalized
and used more effectively for community and school sporting activities".

References

Buildings and structures in Surrey, British Columbia
Minor league baseball venues
Sport in Surrey, British Columbia
Sports venues in British Columbia
Sports venues completed in 1948
1948 establishments in British Columbia